Melanie Thandiwe Newton  (born 6 November 1972), formerly credited as Thandie Newton, is a British actress.

Newton is known for starring roles such as the title character in Beloved (1998), Nyah Nordoff-Hall in Mission: Impossible 2 (2000), Tiffany in Shade (2003), Dame Vaako in The Chronicles of Riddick (2004), Christine in Crash (2004), Linda in The Pursuit of Happyness (2006), Libby in Run Fatboy Run (2007), Stella in RockNRolla (2008), Condoleezza Rice in W. (2008), Laura Wilson in 2012 (2009), Tangie Adrose in For Colored Girls (2010), Maeve Millay in Westworld (2016–2022), Roz Huntley in Line of Duty (2017), and Val in Solo: A Star Wars Story (2018).

Newton has received various awards, including an Emmy Award for Outstanding Supporting Actress in a Drama Series, a BAFTA Award for Best Actress in a Supporting Role, and two Critics' Choice Awards, in addition to nominations for two Golden Globe Awards, a Saturn Award, a Screen Actors Guild Award, and a British Academy Television Award for Best Actress. She was appointed Officer of the Order of the British Empire (OBE) in the 2019 New Year Honours for services to film and charity.

Early life
Melanie Thandiwe Newton was born in the Westminster area of London on 6 November 1972, the daughter of Zimbabwean mother Nyasha Jombe and English father Nick Newton. Her mother was a member of a Shona chieftaincy family, while her father worked as a laboratory technician and artist. Her parents lived in Zambia, and she was born while they were back in England to visit relatives; they then returned to Zambia, where her younger brother was born. This has led her birthplace to be incorrectly reported as Zambia in some sources, but she has confirmed in interviews that she was born in Westminster. "Thandiwe" is a name of Nguni origin and means "beloved".

When Newton was three years old, she returned with her family to England, where they settled in Penzance so her father could help run his family's antique business. She attended St Mary's Roman Catholic Primary School. She later said of her upbringing, "From about the age of five, I was aware that I didn't fit. I was the black atheist kid in the all-white Catholic school run by nuns. I was an anomaly." She began dropping the letter "w" from her first name, making it "Thandie" (pronounced  ). She studied dance at the Tring Park School for the Performing Arts, then studied at Downing College, Cambridge, where she obtained a degree in social anthropology in 1995.

Career

Newton made her film debut in the coming of age comedy-drama Flirting (1991), filmed in 1989 but shelved for two years. She was credited as "Thandie Newton" and subsequently continued to use this name professionally. She then portrayed the slave "Yvette" in the Brad Pitt/Tom Cruise film Interview with the Vampire (1994). Newton appeared in the Merchant Ivory production of Jefferson in Paris as Sally Hemings. Next, she played in Jonathan Demme's drama Beloved (1998), based on Toni Morrison's novel, in which she played the title character, the ghost of a young slave girl whose mother kills her to save her from slavery. The film also starred Oprah Winfrey and Danny Glover. Newton starred as Nyah Nordoff-Hall, again opposite Cruise, in Mission: Impossible 2. Her next role was in the low-budget film It Was an Accident, written by her husband, screenwriter Ol Parker.

Between 2003 and 2005, Newton played Makemba "Kem" Likasu, love interest of John Carter on the American television series ER. She reprised the role for the series finale in 2009. In 2004, she also appeared in The Chronicles of Riddick and Crash. She won a BAFTA award for Best Supporting Actress in 2006 for her role in Crash. She played Chris Gardner's wife, Linda Gardner, in The Pursuit of Happyness. Also in 2006, Newton performed on radio in a pantomime version of Cinderella.

In 2007, Newton co-starred with Eddie Murphy as his love interest in the comedy Norbit. She played opposite Simon Pegg as his ex-girlfriend in the 2008 comedy Run Fatboy Run. She next portrayed Condoleezza Rice, US National Security Advisor and then Secretary of State in W., Oliver Stone's biography of President George W. Bush. The film was released in October 2008.

Newton was an introducer at Wembley Stadium on 7 July 2007, for the UK leg of Live Earth. She was due to introduce former US Vice President Al Gore to the concert, but he was delayed, leaving Newton to tell jokes in an attempt to entertain the audience. Newton next portrayed fictional US First Daughter Laura Wilson in 2012, a disaster film directed by Roland Emmerich and released 13 November 2009.

In July 2011, Newton delivered a TED talk on "Embracing otherness, embracing myself." She discussed finding her "otherness" as a child growing up in two distinct cultures, and as an actress playing many different selves. In 2012, she starred alongside Tyler Perry in the romantic drama film Good Deeds. She was also in Perry's movie For Colored Girls (2010), adapted from Ntozake Shange's 1975 original choreopoem for colored girls who have considered suicide / when the rainbow is enuf. In 2013, Newton starred in Rogue, the first original drama series for DirecTV's Audience Network. She left Rogue during the third season. In 2015, she starred in the US miniseries The Slap.

From 2016 to 2022, Newton portrayed Maeve Millay in HBO science fiction drama series Westworld, for which she garnered universal acclaim. She received several accolades, including a Primetime Emmy Award for Outstanding Supporting Actress in a Drama Series (out of three nominations), two Critics’ Choice Awards, and nominations for a Golden Globe and Screen Actors Guild Award. James White for Empire lauded Newton's performance, saying: "Thandie Newton is killing these emotional moments, giving Maeve a twitchy, panicked air without ever overplaying it and really helping us to feel for her."   William Goodman for Complex wrote: "Westworld becomes the Thandie Newton show, which benefits everyone involved; she’s consistently electric, and the series gives her no shortage of fun things to do."

In 2017, she served as a narrator for the documentary entitled Bill Cosby: Fall of an American Icon, an exposé on the sexual assault charges laid against Cosby, which aired on BBC One. In the same year, Newton played DCI Roseanne "Roz" Huntley in the fourth season of BBC One's Line of Duty, a role for which she received a BAFTA TV Award nomination for Best Actress.

Newton appeared as Val in the Star Wars film Solo: A Star Wars Story, which was released in May 2018 to generally favorable reviews but bombed at the box office with a worldwide gross of $393.2 million. Newton became the first Black woman to have a major non-alien role in a Star Wars film; however, she expressed disappointment in the role as the fate of the character was changed during filming and found it to be a mistake for the franchise in the sense of what it meant for Black women in the franchise. Additionally, Scott Mendelson for Forbes felt that Newton was "underutilized" and David Edelstein for Vulture wrote in praise of her performance: "The only thing wrong with Thandie Newton’s performance is that there’s not enough of it."

In a 2021 interview, Newton announced that she would be changing her first name back to its original form "Thandiwe", and would be credited as such beginning with Reminiscence (2021). She also said that she would attempt to have corrections applied to her past performance credits.

In 2022, Newton played the lead role of Sandra Guidry in the thriller God’s Country which premiered at the Sundance Film Festival. For her performance in the film, she received a nomination for Outstanding Lead Performance at the Gotham Awards.

Charity work
In 2006, Newton contributed a foreword to We Wish: Hopes and Dreams of Cornwall's Children, a book of children's writing published in aid of the NSPCC. In it, she wrote about her childhood memories of growing up in Cornwall, and the way in which its cultural heritage made it easy for her to "enrich every situation with layers of magic and meaning".

In 2008, Newton visited the poverty-stricken village of Nampasso in Mali, describing it as a "humbling experience".

In 2013, Newton led the One Billion Rising flash mob in London for justice, gender equality, and an end to violence.

Personal life
Newton married English filmmaker Ol Parker in 1998, and they separated in 2022. They have two daughters named Ripley (born 2000) and Nico (born 2004), and a son named Booker (born 2014). All three were home births. Nico is also an actress. Newton is currently in a relationship with American musician Elijah Dias, better known by his stage name Lonr, who is 24 years younger than her.

Newton is a vegan and was named PETA's "Sexiest Vegan of 2014" in the UK. In 2007, after Greenpeace members put a sticker that said "this gas-guzzling 4x4 is causing climate change" on the BMW X5 she had only recently purchased, she sold the car and bought a Toyota Prius. She has expressed an affinity for Buddhism. David Schwimmer, who directed Run Fatboy Run, called her "the queen of practical jokes" for her behaviour on film sets.

In 2016, Newton stated she had been the victim of a director who repeatedly showed his friends a video of her in a sexually graphic audition she had made as a teenager. She cited this experience as part of why she had taken the Westworld role, which involved substantial nudity and reflected experiences of survivors of sexual abuse while also asking moral questions about the meaning of humanity and what it means to be humane. In 2018, she said she was disappointed not to have been invited to participate in Time's Up, a movement against sexual harassment, considering that she had been "ostracised" for having spoken out about alleged sexual abuse by a director.

Newton was ranked one of the best-dressed women in 2018 by fashion website Net-a-Porter. Later that year, she was named as one of the 100 most influential black British people in the Powerlist.

In 2020, Newton was one of a number of celebrities and MPs who signed a letter opposing the deportation of 50 violent offenders from the UK to Jamaica. One offender, Ernesto Elliot, went on to commit murder during a knife fight just 6 months later.

Filmography

Film

Television

Music video

References

External links

 
 
 

1972 births
Living people
20th-century English actresses
21st-century English actresses
Actresses from London
Alumni of Downing College, Cambridge
Best Supporting Actress BAFTA Award winners
Black British actresses
English atheists
English Buddhists
English film actresses
English people of Zimbabwean descent
English radio actresses
English television actresses
Officers of the Order of the British Empire
Outstanding Performance by a Cast in a Motion Picture Screen Actors Guild Award winners
Outstanding Performance by a Supporting Actress in a Drama Series Primetime Emmy Award winners
People educated at Tring Park School for the Performing Arts
People from Penzance
People from Westminster
Shona people